State Route 160 (SR 160) is a state highway in the U.S. state of California consisting of two sections. The longer, southern, section is a scenic highway through the alluvial plain of the Sacramento River, linking SR 4 in Antioch with Sacramento via the Antioch Bridge. The northern section, separated from the southern by Sacramento city streets, is the North Sacramento Freeway, running from the 16th Street Bridge over the American River to Interstate 80 Business towards Roseville.

This northern section was deleted from the definition in the Streets and Highways Code in 2003, when the relinquished portion through downtown Sacramento was also removed, but it is still maintained and signed by the California Department of Transportation (Caltrans) as SR 160.

Route description

State Route 160 begins in eastern Antioch at SR 4. After two interchanges, the highway rises onto the two lane Antioch Bridge over the San Joaquin River. It cuts north across the center of Sherman Island, reaching the Sacramento River on the opposite shore. From here to Sacramento, SR 160 never strays far from the river, first following the east levee over the 1949 Three Mile Slough Bridge (a lift bridge), past Brannan Island State Recreation Area, and across SR 12 opposite the river from Rio Vista. After passing Isleton, the highway crosses the river on the Isleton Bridge, a bascule bridge built in 1923, and runs along the west shore on Grand Island, where it meets the east end of SR 220. The Walnut Grove Bridge carries County Route J11 east across the river to Walnut Grove, and, at the north end of the island, SR 160 crosses the 1924 Steamboat Slough Bridge onto Sutter Island and then the 1923 Paintersville Bridge across the Sacramento River to the mainland, both bascule bridges.

On the mainland, SR 160 once again runs atop the east levee, now 1–2 miles (1.5–3 km) west of Interstate 5. The final bridge over the river is the Freeport Bridge, which carries County Route E9 to the west levee, where it turns south to return to SR 160 at the west end of the Paintersville Bridge. About a mile (1.5 km) beyond the Freeport Bridge, SR 160 leaves the levee, enters the city of Sacramento (where state maintenance and control ends), passes under I-5, and farms give way to suburbs. Here the former SR 160 is known as Freeport Boulevard, a major surface road that passes the Sacramento Executive Airport and Sacramento City College. Freeport Boulevard turns to the northwest at about 4th Avenue. It was formerly a one-way pair with 21st Street with Freeport heading one-way southbound and 21st heading one-way northbound. The city converted these streets back to two-way streets for traffic calming purposes in 2008. After a short jog west on Broadway, former SR 160 turns north on the one-way pair of 15th (southbound) and 16th (northbound) Streets, almost immediately crossing Business 80 and entering downtown Sacramento.

15th and 16th Streets lead traffic north past the east side of the State Capitol grounds, which lie between L and N Streets. At F Street, the path of southbound SR 160 jogged west for three blocks to 12th Street; both 12th and 16th Streets pass under the Union Pacific Railroad's Martinez Subdivision (where B Street would be) in four-lane subways, but 15th Street dead-ends. 12th Street remains a one-way southbound roadway, but the two-way RT Light Rail now occupies its east side. 12th Street turns northeast at North B Street, and the two directions of former SR 160 come together at Richards Boulevard, just south of the 16th Street Bridge over the American River and the south end of the state-maintained North Sacramento Freeway. The light rail, which crosses the river between the two directions of SR 160, soon leaves at the Del Paso Boulevard interchange as the freeway turns east. Two folded diamonds at local streets and a northbound-only entrance ramp from Tribute Road are all that remains before SR 160 merges with Business 80 at the Arden Way interchange. Business 80 is also known as the Capital City Freeway here.

The northern portion is also part of the California Freeway and Expressway System, as is the piece south of SR 12 near Rio Vista, though, of the latter, only the southernmost piece in Antioch is built to freeway standards. The northern piece and the southern piece south of SR 12 are also part of the National Highway System, a network of highways that are considered essential to the country's economy, defense, and mobility by the Federal Highway Administration. The entire southern portion, from SR 4 to Sacramento, is eligible to be included in the State Scenic Highway System, and is officially designated as a scenic highway by the California Department of Transportation, meaning that it is a substantial section of highway passing through a "memorable landscape" with no "visual intrusions", where the potential designation has gained popular favor with the community.

History

In the late 1910s, Sacramento County improved the county road along the levee of the Sacramento River between Sacramento and Rio Vista, which crossed the river twice on free ferries near Paintersville and Isleton. A toll ferry across the San Joaquin River connected Sherman Island, south of Rio Vista, with Antioch, where drivers could head west through the Broadway Tunnel to reach the San Francisco Bay, but the road between Rio Vista and the ferry was poor. In 1922, the Victory Highway Association selected this "Netherlands Route" (through what was locally promoted as the "Netherlands of America") for the Victory Highway west of Sacramento, as it was both shorter than the Lincoln Highway route via Stockton and more scenic. In particular, the river district would "impress [the motorist] with the enormous productive resources of this state as well as supply him with an unmatched scenic drive", and the Broadway Tunnel approach to the bay would bring him "over the Victory Highway to the end of his journey in such a fashion that he will never forget the view spread before him as he first comes into sight of the San Francisco Bay region".

Two bascule bridges—the Paintersville Bridge and Isleton Bridge—replaced the free ferries in 1923, and are of a type patented by Joseph B. Strauss, who went on to design the Golden Gate Bridge. Local businessmen Aven Hanford and Oscar Klatt replaced the toll ferry with the tolled Antioch Bridge in mid-1926, almost a year before they opened the larger Carquinez Bridge to the west. The counties of Contra Costa and Sacramento organized a joint highway district in November 1925 to fund an improvement of the northern approach from Rio Vista; the concrete highway was completed in July 1927, creating a fully paved continuous route between Sacramento and the bay.

The legislature added this road to the state highway system in 1933, and it became part of Legislative Route 11, which had stretched east from Sacramento along US 50. This part of Route 11 was not assigned a sign route number in 1934, but, by 1937, when the new Broadway Low Level Tunnel opened, it was part of Sign Route 24. That route had initially begun at Woodland and traveled northeast and east through the Feather River Canyon, and was extended southeast from Woodland along Sign Route 16 to Sacramento and then south and west via Antioch to the San Francisco – Oakland Bay Bridge approach in Berkeley. The California Freeway and Expressway System was formed in 1959, and included in the planned upgrades was the road between Antioch and Rio Vista. (North of Rio Vista the present SR 84 was part of the system.) The entire length was included in the State Scenic Highway System in 1963. In the 1964 renumbering, the Antioch-Sacramento roadway was split between two routes: Route 84 from Antioch to SR 12 near Rio Vista, and Route 160 from SR 12 to Sacramento. However, the entire route was marked as SR 160, and in 1981 the legislative definition was changed to reflect this.

The part of SR 160 through and north of downtown Sacramento began as part of Legislative Route 3, which was added to the state highway system under the first bond issue, passed in 1910, and left the city on the 16th Street Bridge over the American River, following Del Paso Boulevard, El Camino Avenue, and Auburn Boulevard to Roseville. (The short piece from the end of Route 3 near the State Capitol south to Broadway and Freeport Boulevard was Route 4, which followed SR 99 towards Los Angeles.) Route 3 between Sacramento and Roseville was also part of the Victory Highway, and was marked as part of US 40 in 1928 and US 99E in 1929. The North Sacramento Freeway opened on October 6, 1947, bypassing this route from the bridge to Auburn Boulevard near Ben Ali. In 1955, the Elvas Freeway opened from the midpoint of the North Sacramento Freeway to the east side of downtown, and US 99E was moved off the south half of the older North Sacramento Freeway and onto the Elvas Freeway. The North Sacramento Freeway was included in the California Freeway and Expressway System when it was created in 1959, and the part of Route 3 southwest of the Elvas Freeway, which carried I-80, became part of SR 160 in the 1964 renumbering.

By 2000, the city of Sacramento maintained the non-freeway portion of SR 160 within the city limits under a contract with Caltrans. However, since Caltrans's main goal is to move traffic efficiently, the city was not able to carry out pedestrian-friendly projects that they and local residents wanted. Under a law passed in July 1999, Caltrans was authorized to relinquish any part of Route 160 within the city limits to Sacramento. The two agencies agreed, and on October 19, 2000, the portion from the south city limits to the American River became the full responsibility of the city. A 2003 amendment to the Streets and Highways Code erroneously deleted not only this part, but the North Sacramento Freeway as well.

A project to convert the former southbound-only Richards Boulevard access just south of the American River to a standard signalized intersection was completed in August 2007; this improves access to existing and future development in the area, including redevelopment of a former rail yard, while slowing northbound traffic heading for the bridge and freeway. Another project converting Freeport Boulevard and 21st Street south of Broadway into two-way streets was also completed. 21st Street has carried northbound traffic since 1974, when Caltrans took it over. This will calm traffic while improving the intersection at the south end of the former one-way pair, which the RT Light Rail now crosses 21st Street just to the north of. In addition, the three blocks of F Street that carried southbound SR 160 from 12th Street to 15th Street have been calmed by the addition of a roundabout at 13th Street.

In 2012, SR 4 was re-routed to go further south to bypass Oakley and Brentwood. The southern end of SR 160 was then extended south to cover the part of the freeway that is no longer designated as SR 4, from Main Street (where State Route 4 originally exited the freeway) to the fork of the new SR 4 (formerly known as the State Route 4 Bypass, or Bypass Road).

In 2014, construction began at the interchange with SR 4 to complete the two remaining ramps that would link southbound SR 160 to eastbound SR 4 and westbound SR 4 to northbound SR 160. Construction was completed in March 2016.

Major intersections

See also

Transportation in the Sacramento metropolitan area

References

External links

Bay Area FasTrak – includes toll information on the Antioch Bridge, and the other Bay Area toll facilities
California @ AARoads - California 160
California Highway Conditions: SR 160
California Highways: SR 160

160
160
State Route 160
State Route 160
State Route 160
160
160
Antioch, California
U.S. Route 99
U.S. Route 40